The Carpathian Euroregion is an international association formed on February 14, 1993, by the representatives of the regional administrations of Poland, Ukraine, Slovakia and Hungary in the city of Debrecen. In 2000, the request from several regional administrations of Romania to join the Euroregion was accepted.

The region
The Carpathian Euroregion comprises 19 administrative units of five countries from Central and East Europe, which are Poland, Slovakia, Hungary, Ukraine and Romania. Its total area is about 160 000 km2 or over 60 thousands square miles. It is inhabited by over 15 million people.

The Carpathian Euroregion is designed to bring together the people who inhabit the region of the Carpathian Mountains and to facilitate their cooperation in the fields of science, culture, education, trade, tourism and economy.

Due to its size, another Euroregion was created within it: the Biharia Euroregion, centered in Oradea. It covers two neighboring counties of Bihor in Romania and Hajdu-Bihar in Hungary.

Constituent regions
 (7): Bihor County, Botoșani County, Harghita County, Maramureș County, Sălaj County, Satu Mare County, Suceava County
 (5): Borsod-Abaúj-Zemplén County, Hajdú-Bihar County, Heves County, Jász-Nagykun-Szolnok County, Szabolcs-Szatmár-Bereg County
 (4): Chernivtsi Oblast, Ivano-Frankivsk Oblast, Lviv Oblast, Zakarpattya Oblast
 (2): Košice Region, Prešov Region
 (1): Subcarpathian Voivodeship

Largest cities
 Lviv  - 729,000
 Chernivtsi  - 259,000
 Košice  - 235,000
 Ivano-Frankivsk  - 225,500
 Oradea - 206,600
 Debrecen  - 206,200
 Rzeszów  - 179,500
 Miskolc  - 169,200

Gallery

External links
Carpathian Europregion - Polish website
 Council of Europe: euroregions
Working paper on Euroregions with a list
Carpathian Euroregion - Geographical data

Euroregions of Hungary
Euroregions of Poland
Euroregions of Romania
Subdivisions of Slovakia
Euroregions of Ukraine